When Love Grows Cold is a 1926 American silent drama film directed by Harry O. Hoyt, and starring Clive Brook and Natacha Rambova in her only screen starring performance. Rambova was chiefly famous for being the wife of Rudolph Valentino. The film was originally titled Do Clothes Make the Woman? But in view of Valentino's recent divorce from Rambova, the distributor took the opportunity to bill her as 'Mrs Valentino' and changed the title to When Love Grows Cold. She was mortally offended and never worked in film again.

Plot
As described in a film magazine review, Margaret Benson gives up her stage career to marry Jerry Benson, a dreamer who fails to put over his plans when he gets his chance before a mammoth oil company board. The wife, however, goes before the board and gets the plans approved. Wealth comes to the family and Jerry becomes a company official. Gloria Trevor becomes a tool of William Graves, president of the firm, in a plot to break up the Benson home. Graves covets Margaret. He ruins Jerry in the stock market. In the end the plot fails and Margaret and Jerry are reunited.

Cast

Preservation
With no prints of When Love Grows Cold located in any film archives, it is a lost film. Only bit fragments and a trailer survive from this film.

References

External links

1926 films
American silent feature films
Films directed by Harry O. Hoyt
Lost American films
Films based on short fiction
1926 drama films
Silent American drama films
American black-and-white films
Film Booking Offices of America films
1926 lost films
Lost drama films
1920s American films